The Holiday Cup is a water polo competition held in the United States since 1998.

It was established as a competition between four countries held in summer, and was expanded to six countries and moved to December.

History

Medal summary

References
History
USA Water Polo

 
Recurring sporting events established in 1998
Hol
International water polo competitions